"Just Another Night" is a song written and performed by Mick Jagger, released as the first single from his debut album, She's the Boss, in 1985.

Background
The music video, directed by Julien Temple, features actress Rae Dawn Chong as Jagger's love interest.

Jagger was accused of infringing the copyright of another song entitled "Just Another Night" by Patrick Alley, a Jamaican reggae singer from New York. A six-member jury ruled in Jagger's favor in 1988.

Personnel
Mick Jagger – lead and backing vocals
Jeff Beck – guitar
John "Rabbit" Bundrick – synthesizer
Aïyb Dieng – shaker
Sly Dunbar – drums
Anton Fier – Simmons drums
Bill Laswell – synthesizer
Ron Magness – synthesizer
Robbie Shakespeare – bass guitar

Production
Mick Jagger - producer
Bill Laswell/Material - producer
James Farber - engineer
Dave Jerden - engineer
Bill Scheniman - engineer
Peter Corriston - art direction, design
Erica Lennard - photography

Charts

Weekly Charts

Year-end charts

References

Mick Jagger songs
1985 singles
1985 songs
Songs written by Mick Jagger
Song recordings produced by Mick Jagger
Columbia Records singles
Song recordings produced by Bill Laswell
Songs involved in plagiarism controversies